Henkelodon was a small mammal of the Upper Jurassic. It was a relatively early member of the extinct order Multituberculata. Henkelodon was a European herbivore that lived during the "age of the dinosaurs". It lies within the suborder "Plagiaulacida" and family Paulchoffatiidae.

The genus Henkelodon ("Henkel's tooth") was named by Hahn G. in 1977 based on a single species.

Fossil remains of the species Henkelodon naias were discovered in the Kimmeridgian (Upper Jurassic)-age Alcobaça Formation of Guimarota, Portugal. The remains consisted of one upper jaw. According to Kielan-Jaworowska and Hurum, 2001, (p. 413), this genus was named in 1987. However, Hahn and Hahn 2000 (p. 105) supports 1977.

References

Further reading 
 Hahn G (1977), "Neue Schädel-Reste von Multituberculaten (Mamm.) aus dem Malm Portugals". Geologica et Palaeontologica, 11, p. 161-186 (New skull remains of Multituberculates (Mammalia) from the Malm of Portugal)
 Hahn G & Hahn R (2000), Multituberculates from the Guimarota mine, p. 97-107 in Martin T & *Krebs B (eds), Guimarota - A Jurassic Ecosystem, Verlag Dr Friedrich Pfeil, München.
Kielan-Jaworowska Z & Hurum JH (2001), "Phylogeny and Systematics of multituberculate mammals". Paleontology 44, p. 389-429.
 author and year information were kindly supplied by Vince Ward.
 Much of this information has been derived from  Multituberculata Cope, 1884.

Multituberculates
Kimmeridgian life
Jurassic mammals of Europe
Jurassic Portugal
Fossils of Portugal
Fossil taxa described in 1977
Prehistoric mammal genera